Chaetanthera elegans is a flowering plant species in the genus Chaetanthera found in Chile.

References

External links 
 
 
 ''Chaetanthera elegans at Tropicos

Mutisieae
Plants described in 1856